Angelo Elia (born 26 August 1957) is a retired Swiss football striker.

References

1957 births
Living people
Swiss men's footballers
FC Lugano players
Servette FC players
Swiss Super League players
Association football forwards
Switzerland international footballers